Tireli is a village in Dogon country in Mali on the Bandiagara Escarpment in the Bandiagara Cercle. It is located 11 km south-south-west of Sangha and Banani and 28 km east of Bandiagara.

Gallery

Literature
  Full-text in Dutch.

References

External links

Video
 . 1992. Time 24:45-39:09.  Consulted on 6 March 2021.
 . Lrousseau22, 10 December 2010. Consulted on 6 March 2021.

Dogon Country
Mopti Region
Populated places in Mopti Region